Anthems for Doomed Youth is the third studio album by English garage rock band The Libertines, released on 11 September 2015.
The album contains two notable literary references, the tracks "Anthem for Doomed Youth" and "Gunga Din" referencing poems of the same titles by Wilfred Owen and Rudyard Kipling respectively. "Gunga Din" was released as the album's first single on 2 July 2015. The album's second single, "Glasgow Coma Scale Blues", was released on 20 August 2015. The success of the album produced multiple European tours from 2015-2019.

Release
The album was released in 3 formats: Digital, CD, and Vinyl. There is also a Deluxe Edition, released on CD and Digitally, including extra tracks. A box set, including a Deluxe CD, a Vinyl copy, exclusive film, and signed art prints, was also released. 
To celebrate the release of the new LP 'a week of shenanigans' was announced, mainly taking place at Camden's Dublin Castle venue. The run of events was titled 'Somewhere Over the Railings'.

Critical reception

Reviews for the album were generally positive, earning a rating of 70 out of 100 on Metacritic, indicating generally favourable reviews. Charles Pitter at PopMatters declared the album "an enjoyable overload of charisma".

Accolades

Track listing
All tracks written by Doherty and Barât.

Charts

References

The Libertines albums
2015 albums
Virgin EMI Records albums
Harvest Records albums